Vito Reale (Viggiano, 23 December 1883 – Rome, 28 April 1953) was an Italian politician, who served as third and last Minister of the Interior of the Badoglio I Cabinet. He was also a member of the Italian Chamber of Deputies in the early 1920s, of the Italian Constituent Assembly after World War II, and of the Italian Senate from 1948 until his death in 1953.

Biography

He worked as a lawyer in the tribunal of Potenza, and was Mayor of Viggiano, his hometown, from 1910 to 1915, and well as member of the Regional Council of Basilicata from 1912. In 1919 he was elected to the Italian Chamber of Deputies and again in 1921, until 1924; during the latter he was secretary of the Permanent Parliamentary Commission of Internal Affairs. After the fall of the Fascist regime in 1943 he became State Undersecretary for the Interior and later (formally from February 1944, but de facto from November 1943, as the titular minister Umberto Ricci had remained in Rome) Minister of the Interior in the Badoglio I Cabinet of the "Kingdom of the South". After the end of the war, he was a member of the Italian Constituent Assembly from 1946 to 1948 and of the Italian Senate from 1948 until his death in 1953.

References

1883 births
1953 deaths
Government ministers of Italy
Italian Ministers of the Interior
Members of the Chamber of Deputies (Kingdom of Italy)
Members of the Constituent Assembly of Italy

it:Vito Reale
arz:ڤيتو رايل